Peter William Whiteford (born 3 August 1980) is a Scottish professional golfer.

Whiteford was born in Kirkcaldy. He turned professional in 2002.

Whiteford won twice on PGA EuroPro Tour from 2002 to 2003 and has played on the Challenge and European Tours since then. He won twice on the Challenge Tour in 2007 and once in 2009. Since 2010, he has established himself on the European Tour and Challenge tour. As of 2019, Whiteford is a golf coach focused on performance and the short game.

Amateur wins
1996 Scottish Boys Under 16 Stroke Play Championship

Professional wins (5)

Challenge Tour wins (3)

Challenge Tour playoff record (1–1)

PGA EuroPro Tour wins (2)

Playoff record
European Tour playoff record (0–1)

Results in major championships

CUT = missed the halfway cut
Note: Whiteford only played in The Open Championship.

Team appearances
Amateur
European Boys' Team Championship (representing Scotland): 1997

See also
2007 Challenge Tour graduates
2009 Challenge Tour graduates

References

External links

Scottish male golfers
European Tour golfers
Sportspeople from Kirkcaldy
1980 births
Living people